Luke Polselli (born 6 August 1998) is a Italy international rugby league footballer who plays as a  or  for the Sunshine Coast Falcons in the Queensland Cup.

Background
Polselli is of Italian descent.

Playing career

Club career
Polselli previously played for the Mackay Cutters in the Queensland Cup

He played in 18 games, and scored 9 tries for the Sunshine Coast Falcons in the 2022 Queensland Cup.

International career
In 2022 Polselli was named in the Italy squad for the 2021 Rugby League World Cup.

References

External links
Sunshine Coast Falcons profile
Italy profile

1998 births
Living people
Australian rugby league players
Australian people of Italian descent
Rugby league centres
Rugby league fullbacks
Italy national rugby league team players
Sunshine Coast Falcons players